The South African type SK tender was a steam locomotive tender.

Type SK tenders were rebuilt from Type SH tenders which had entered service in 1904 and 1905. The rebuilding resulted in a tender with a larger water tank and larger coal bunker.

Origin
The original Natal Government Railways (NGR) Class B Mastodon and Class A Pacific locomotives and tenders were designed in 1904 by NGR Locomotive Superintendent D.A. Hendrie.

Type SH tenders entered service as tenders to these locomotives in 1904 and 1905, built by the North British Locomotive Company.

Rebuilding
From c. 1925, several of the Type SH tenders were completely rebuilt by the South African Railways (SAR) by mounting a new upper structure on the existing underframe, with larger water tanks and a larger coal capacity. These rebuilt tenders had a more modern appearance, with flush sides all the way to the top of the coal bunker. They were designated Type SK.

The program to rebuild several older tender types with new upper structures was begun by Col F.R. Collins DSO, who approved several of the detailed drawings for the work during his term in office as Chief Mechanical Engineer (CME) of the SAR from 1922 to 1929. It was continued by his successor, A.G. Watson.

Characteristics

Classification letters
Since many tender types are interchangeable between different locomotive classes and types, a tender classification system was adopted by the SAR. The first letter of the tender type indicates the classes of engines to which it could be coupled. The "S_" tenders could be used with the locomotive classes as shown.
 NGR Class B of 1904, SAR Class 1.
 NGR Class B of 1906, SAR Class 1B.
 NGR Class A of 1905, SAR Class 2.

The second letter indicates the tender's water capacity.

References

SK